Miriam I. D. van Rijsingen is a Dutch art historian and specialist in feminist art history.

References

External links 

Dutch art historians
Dutch women historians
Dutch women academics
Women art historians
Living people
Year of birth missing (living people)
Feminist historians